Sam Roland Heughan (born 30 April 1980) is a Scottish actor, producer, author, and entrepreneur. He is best known for his starring role as Jamie Fraser in the Starz drama series Outlander (2014–present) for which he has won the People's Choice Award for Favorite Cable Sci-Fi/Fantasy TV Actor and the Saturn Award for Best Actor on Television, and received a nomination for the Critics' Choice Television Award for Best Actor in a Drama Series.

Heughan has also starred in films such as the spy comedy The Spy Who Dumped Me (2018), The Empty Train, and the superhero action film Bloodshot (2020). Among his numerous plays he was nominated for the Laurence Olivier Award for Most Promising Performer for his performance in Outlying Islands performed at the Royal Court Theatre Upstairs.
 
Heughan and his Outlander co-star Graham McTavish co-wrote Clanlands: Whisky, Warfare, and a Scottish Adventure Like No Other which reached number one on the New York Times Best Seller List for hardcover nonfiction, and combined print and e-book nonfiction in November 2020. The same year Heughan launched his own whisky brand, The Sassenach (named after his Outlander character's nickname for his wife, Claire), winning consecutive double golds in the 2020 and 2021 San Francisco World Spirits Competition.

Education and early life
Sam Roland Heughan was born on 30 April 1980 in the historic county of Dumfries and Galloway. His parents had been part of a hippie community in London called Gandalf's Garden which was heavily influenced by the works of J. R. R. Tolkien inspiring them to name Heughan and his older brother after characters from The Lord of the Rings. Sam’s mother, Chrissie Heughan, an artist and artisan papermaker struggled to raise the two brothers after their father left when they were both young.

Aged five, Heughan moved from Balmaclellan to nearby New Galloway where he attended Kells Primary School. During this time he lived in converted stables in the grounds of Kenmure Castle. Moving to Edinburgh at age twelve he attended James Gillespie's High School for a year and then the Edinburgh Rudolf Steiner School until the end of the sixth year. He subsequently spent two years working and travelling and was awarded a prestigious place at RSAMD, the Royal Scottish Academy of Music and Drama (now the Royal Conservatoire of Scotland) in Glasgow, graduating in 2003.

During his schooling, Heughan performed in numerous plays including The Twits at Citizens Theatre, an adaptation of Fyodor Dostoyevsky's Crime and Punishment, Anton Chekhov's The Seagull, Aeschylus's Greek tragedy Prometheus Bound, and Shakespeare's Romeo and Juliet.  In 2002, shortly before graduating Heughan was one of four students chosen to represent RSAMD at the BBC Carlton Hobbs radio talent competition. His alma mater, the RCS, awarded him an honorary Doctorate at the class of 2022 graduation ceremony.

Career
While still a student Heughan appeared in Outlying Islands, a play by Scottish playwright David Greig. The play premiered at the Traverse Theatre in Edinburgh before moving to the Royal Court Theatre in London. Heughan was nominated for a Laurence Olivier Award for Most Promising Performer for his performance.

In 2004 Heughan appeared in his first professional television role in the miniseries Island at War, a WWII drama about the German occupation of the Channel Islands. The following year he appeared in several episodes of the Scottish soap opera River City and portrayed adulterous husband Pony William in David Harrower's play Knives in Hens at the Tron Theatre in Glasgow. Between 2006 and 2009 Heughan appeared in a number of made-for-television films and miniseries including BBC and PBS's collaborative miniseries The Wild West (2006), Channel 4's docudrama, A Very British Sex Scandal (2007), and BBC Four's Breaking the Mould (2009). During that time he also made appearances in a number of television series, including an episode of ITV's Midsomer Murders, ITV's crime drama Rebus, and two episodes of BBC's political drama Party Animals. Between 2007 and 2009 Heughan made appearances in several live productions, including Noël Coward's The Vortex at the Royal Exchange Theatre, Shakespeare's Hamlet at the Citizen's Theatre, Iain F. MacLeod's The Pearlfishers at the Traverse Theatre, Shakespeare's Romeo and Juliet at the Dundee Repertory Theatre, Macbeth at the Royal Lyceum Theatre, and Nicholas de Jongh's Plague Over England at the Duchess Theatre.

In 2009, Heughan landed a recurring role as Scott Nielson, Nurse Cherry Malone's boyfriend and a secret drug dealer in the BBC soap opera Doctors. He was nominated for a British Soap Award, in the category Villain of the Year, for his twenty-one episode stint on the series. The following year, Heughan starred as the title character in the direct-to-video feature Young Alexander the Great, which was filmed in Egypt and explored the life of the teenager who would become Alexander the Great. He went on to star in BBC's television film First Light, the story of RAF pilot Geoffrey Wellum's experiences flying a Spitfire in the Battle of Britain, as documented in his WWII memoir of the same name. From there he featured in PBS's BAFTA-winning mini-series Any Human Heart, the story of author Logan Mountstuart's life in the context of historical events surrounding him, based upon William Boyd's novel of the same name. Heughan returned to theatre later that year in dramatist Phyllis Nagy's adaptation of Patricia Highsmith's novel The Talented Mr. Ripley at the Royal & Derngate. Throughout that same year, Heughan portrayed Hugh Tennent, founder of Tennent's Lager, in a series of comical commercials, which won a number of accolades at the Scottish Advertising Awards.

Hallmark Channel's original film A Princess for Christmas starred Heughan as Prince Ashton in 2011, a role which saw him appear opposite Roger Moore and secure a nomination for Most Inspiring Performance in Television at the 20th Annual Grace Awards. That same year, he featured in Steve Waters' sold-out play Amphibians, a dual story of Olympic swimmers Max and Elsa, at the Bridewell Theatre. For the next two years he starred as Batman in the touring stage show Batman Live. During this time he made the news for his assistance in a real-life citizen's arrest. In 2012, he performed the title role in Shakepeare's King John at the Òran Mór Theatre.

In 2013, Heughan was cast as Jamie Fraser in the Starz time-travel drama series Outlander. He was the first cast member officially announced, to great praise by the author of the series, Diana Gabaldon, who said, "That man is a Scot to the bone and Jamie Fraser to the heart. Having seen Sam Heughan not just act, but be Jamie, I feel immensely grateful to the production team for their painstaking attention to the soul of the story and characters." The role is recurring, with Heughan reprising the character of Jamie Fraser in seasons one (which premiered in 2014) through five and the upcoming season six. He and his co-star, Caitriona Balfe assumed the additional role of producers on the series in 2019.

Turning to independent films in 2014, Heughan appeared in the psychological thriller Emulsion, the story of a man haunted by the disappearance of his wife. He also starred in the comedy Heart of Lightness, in which Heughan appeared with two of his future Outlander co-stars: Laura Donnelly, who plays Jamie's sister Jenny Murray, and Rosie Day, who played Mary Hawkins in the second season. He went on to play the lead role of Jacob in the 2016 independent film When the Starlight Ends, which premiered at the Other Venice Film Festival.

In 2018, Heughan co-starred as MI6 agent Sebastian Henshaw in the action comedy film The Spy Who Dumped Me, opposite Mila Kunis and Kate McKinnon, which he filmed during an Outlander filming hiatus. That same year, in his first voice-acting project, Heughan appeared in the Warner Bros. Interactive Entertainment video game Lego DC Super-Villains as the Mirror Master. In May of that year, Heughan was a guest on BBC Two Scotland's special The Adventure Show, alongside Cameron McNeish, in an episode titled "Take A Hike" that focused on Scotland's passion for walking. It was also announced that Heughan would portray Corporal Jimmy Dalton in Bloodshot, an adaptation of the best-selling comic book from the Valiant universe, opposite Vin Diesel and Michael Sheen. Bloodshot premiered in March 2020. In November 2018, Heughan was cast as Tom Buckingham, the lead role in SAS: Red Notice, a film based on the novel of the same name by Andy McNab.

In 2019, it was announced that Heughan would play Paul Newman in To Olivia, a biopic about Patricia Neal and Roald Dahl starring Keeley Hawes and Hugh Bonneville. In 2020, Heughan was cast as Henry in the Regency-era romantic comedy Mr. Malcom's List, based on a book of the same name by Suzanne Allain. Heughan was also cast alongside Priyanka Chopra Jonas and Celine Dion in the romantic drama Text for You, a remake of the German film SMS Fur Dich.

In addition to acting Heughan served as the first Global Brand Ambassador for the English clothing label Barbour beginning in 2016. He released several collections since his initial autumn/winter line in 2017, all of which he co-designed.

In November 2020, Heughan published a travelogue titled Clanlands: Whisky, Warfare, and a Scottish Adventure Like No Other with Outlander co-star Graham McTavish. The book became a bestseller, reaching No. 1 on the New York Times' Best Seller Lists for hardcover nonfiction and for combined print and e-book nonfiction and #1 on the Publishers Weekly Bestseller List for hardcover nonfiction, among other lists. Clanlands serves as a companion to Men in Kilts: A Roadtrip With Sam and Graham, an eight-part television series conceived by and starring Heughan and McTavish that premiered on the Starz channel in February 2021.

Also in 2020, Heughan launched his own whisky brand, The Sassenach, through the Great Glen Company, which he founded. The Sassenach is available in the UK and select US states and earned a double gold medal at the 2020 San Francisco World Spirits Competition.

To Olivia premiered on February 19, 2021 in the United Kingdom, via Sky Cinema. The film's North American distribution rights were acquired by Vertical Entertainment, and was released in the United States on April 15, 2022. The film received mixed reviews.

Another film starring Heughan, SAS: Red Notice, a British action thriller based on the novel of the same name by Andy McNab, was released the same year. The film premiered in United Kingdom on March 12, 2021 via Sky Cinema. Vertical Entertainment and Redbox Entertainment released the film in the United States on March 16, 2021. The film was retitled SAS: Rise of the Black Swan on Netflix to avoid confusion with the Netflix-produced film Red Notice, which was also released in 2021. The film received mostly positive to mixed reviews.

Heughen has wrapped up filming of the romantic drama Love Again (previously titled Text For You), as of early 2021, in which he will star alongside Priyanka Chopra and Celine Dion. The film is an English-language remake of the 2016 German film SMS für Dich, itself based on the 2009 novel of the same name by Sofie Cramer. The film is scheduled to be released theatrically on May 12, 2023, by Sony Pictures Releasing.

Political views and philanthropy
Heughan was a vocal supporter of Scottish independence from the United Kingdom during the 2014 independence referendum, going on record as saying, "I was a no and thought independence wasn't a good idea initially, but then I did a 180 and towards the end became quite vocal in the Yes campaign. I thought that ultimately it was a move towards more democracy for the people of Scotland."

Heughan credits much of his early success to his participation in youth theatre and, in August 2014, became a patron for Youth Theatre Arts Scotland. Of his position as patron, he has said, "I think that what I'd like to instill is that if you join the youth theatre, it's a gateway into greater career prospects." He supports the charitable organisation's mission 'to transform lives through youth theatre by providing inspiring participatory opportunities for young people in Scotland.'

In 2015, Heughan started the organisation My Peak Challenge, a training, nutrition, and support programme that provides participants with a sense of community as they work towards personal goals, while concurrently raising money for charity. The foundation has partnered with Leukemia Lymphoma Research, Bear Strength Clothing and Fight Camp Glasgow to raise funds for cancer research. In 2019, Heughan teamed up with Omaze, raffling off a date to the 2019 MPC Gala, which raised $2,892,080 for Bloodwise UK.

In September 2016, Heughan partook in the Great North Run to raise funds for Bloodwise, which he has supported since 2011, and became president of Scotland Bloodwise.

In 2018, he ran both the Stirling and EMF Edinburgh Marathons in the space of a month to raise money for Cahonas Scotland and their Testicular Cancer Education and Awareness Programme. He raised £38,224 for the charity.

Personal life
Sam lives near Glasgow.

Filmography

Film

Television

Theatre

Video games

Awards and nominations

Honours
 Heughan received an honorary doctorate "in recognition for his outstanding contribution to acting and charitable endeavours" from the University of Stirling in June 2019
 He was awarded an honorary doctorate in recognition of his artistic success and charitable work by the University of Glasgow in July 2019
 He received an honorary doctorate from the Royal Conservatoire of Scotland on 7 July 2022

References

External links

 
Sassenach Spirits website
 
"Sam Heughan at UofG Dumfries Graduation". University of Glasgow Facebook. 4 July 2019. 

1980 births
Scottish people of Irish descent
21st-century Scottish male actors
Alumni of the Royal Conservatoire of Scotland
Living people
People from Dumfries and Galloway
Scottish male film actors
Scottish male Shakespearean actors
Scottish male soap opera actors
Scottish male stage actors
Scottish male television actors